"She Knows Me Too Well" is a song written by Brian Wilson and Mike Love for the American rock band The Beach Boys, about a man who is engrossed and obsessed in his own jealousy and insecurity. It was released on the 1965 album The Beach Boys Today!, initially serving as the B-side of their "When I Grow Up (To Be a Man)" single in 1964.  It was one of the first songs that Brian wrote while under the influence of marijuana.

Composition
Brian considered the song a tribute to Burt Bacharach. According to Allmusic, "This song can essentially be called 'son of "Don't Worry Baby".' It's built around the same kinds of Spector-inspired chord changes and also has a similar sense of vulnerability." According to PopMatters,

Interpreting its lyrics,

David Leaf believed the song "is another of the important musical developments on the road to Pet Sounds, and in retrospect, hearing this in 1965 might have felt very strange … almost like you were hearing a cut from Pet Sounds a year before that album even existed." He also notes that it was "a gorgeous production, but it took a little while to get used to, probably because the bittersweet chord changes and harmonies were more sophisticated than the typical pop ballad of the day."

Recording
The song was recorded over two sessions at United Western Recorders in early August, both engineered by Chuck Britz and produced by Brian Wilson: the first session for the instrumental track took place on August 5 in tandem with "When I Grow Up (To Be a Man)"; three days later, the vocals were recorded. They are doubletracked, just as they are on most Beach Boys songs. The instrumental track features Carl Wilson on both lead and rhythm electric guitars, Alan Jardine on electric bass guitar, Brian Wilson on acoustic upright piano, and Dennis Wilson on drums. The song features Brian Wilson on lead vocal and Brian, Carl & Dennis Wilson, Mike Love, and Al Jardine on backing vocals.

On the Unsurpassed Masters Vol. 7 (1964): The Alternate "Beach Boys Today" Album Vol. 1 bootleg, various recording sessions were released in high quality. Four takes of the instrumental track (plus rehearsals) were released on this bootleg, as well as two backing vocal overdubs and Brian's lead vocal overdub.

Release
In August 1964, "She Knows Me Too Well" was released in the United States as the B-side of the "When I Grow Up (To Be a Man)" single. The single, the band's tenth in the United States, peaked at number nine position on the Billboard charts, with "She Knows Me Too Well" in its own right placing at number 101 in Billboard and number 93 in Cash Box. The song was treated as the A-side at Vancouver's popular CFUN station and reached number seven locally.

The song was also released in the United Kingdom, again as the B-side of the "When I Grow Up (To Be a Man)" single, which was the band's sixth there. The single didn't fare as well, but still peaked at number 27 on the charts.

Cash Box described it as "a captivating cha cha beat romancer that's...sure to please the kids."

American rock band Stone Temple Pilots recorded a cover version of the song during the sessions for their 1994 album Purple. This version of the song was included on the band's 2019 "Super Deluxe" version of the album.

Personnel
Track details courtesy of session archivist Craig Slowinski.

The Beach Boys
Al Jardine – electric bass guitar, harmony and background vocals
Mike Love – harmony and background vocals
Brian Wilson – lead, harmony and background vocals; acoustic upright piano
Carl Wilson –  harmony and background vocals; electric lead and rhythm guitars
Dennis Wilson – harmony and background vocals; drums

Additional personnel
Chuck Britz – sound engineer
Russ Titelman – microphone boom with screwdriver

References

1965 songs
The Beach Boys songs
Songs written by Brian Wilson
Songs written by Mike Love
Song recordings produced by Brian Wilson
Capitol Records singles